RK Železničar 1949 is a Serbian handball club based in Niš. They compete in the Serbian Handball Super League.

History
The club was formed as RK Naissus on 7 September 2009 by the amalgamation of RK Železničar and ORK Niš. They immediately started competing in the Serbian Handball Super League by inheriting the spot from ORK Niš.

On 5 December 2011, the club changed its name to RK Železničar. They won their first trophy, the Serbian Handball Cup, in the 2013–14 season. After suffering relegation from the top flight in 2016, the club spent the following season without competing.

Ahead of the 2017–18 season, the club received a wild card entry to the Serbian Handball Super League.

Crest, colours, supporters

Kits

Honours
Serbian Cup
 2013–14, 2017–18

Notable players
The list includes players who played for their respective national teams in any major international tournaments, such as the Olympic Games, World Championships and European Championships:

  Stefan Janković
  Jovo Damjanović
  Darko Đukić
  Milan Đukić
  Dobrivoje Marković
  Ratko Nikolić
  Stevan Sretenović
  Aleksandar Stojanović

Head coaches

  Vladan Stošić (2009–2010)
  Miloš Stanić (2010–2011)
  Zoran Živković (2011)
  Aleksandar Živković (2011–2012)
  Jovica Cvetković (2012)
  Nikola Marković (2012)
  Jovica Cvetković (2012)
  Nedeljko Vučković (2013)
  Vladimir Stanojević (2013–2014)
  Siniša Prokić (2014)
  Miroslav Đorđević (2014–2015)
  Siniša Prokić (2015)
  Nebojša Bokić (2015–2016)
  Josif Petković (2017–2018)
  Veselin Vujović (2018–2019)
  Đorđe Teodorović (2019–present)

References

External links
  
 RK Železničar 1949 – EHF competition record
 RK Železničar 1949 at srbijasport.net 

Zeleznicar 1949
Handball clubs established in 2009
2009 establishments in Serbia
Sport in Niš